The border between the countries of France and the United Kingdom in Europe is a maritime border that stretches along the Channel, the North Sea and the Atlantic Ocean. The Channel Tunnel links the two countries underground and is defined as a 'land frontier', and not widely recognised as a land border.

It is defined by several international arbitrations from 1977, 1978, 1982, 1988 and 1991 for the maritime border and by the Treaty of Canterbury (1986) for the channel tunnel.

Maritime border 

  (point A)
  (point B)
  (point C)
  (point D)
  (point D1)
  (point D2)
  (point D3)
  (point D4)
  (point E)
  (point F)
  (point F1)
  (point G)
  (point H)
  (point I)
  (point J)
  (point K)
  (point L)
  (point M)
  (point N)

In 2003, France signed an agreement with the United Kingdom to introduce 'juxtaposed controls' (in French, des bureaux de contrôles nationaux juxtaposés, or 'BCNJ') at Dover on the British side and at Calais, Dunkerque and Boulogne-sur-Mer on the French side.

This means that, when travelling from Dover to France by ferry, French immigration checks are carried out by the Police aux Frontières on British soil before boarding the ferry, whilst French customs checks take place upon arrival on French soil.

When travelling in the reverse direction from Calais, Dunkerque and Boulogne-sur-Mer in France to the UK by ferry, French immigration exit checks and British immigration checks both take place on French soil before boarding the ferry, whilst British customs checks take place upon arrival on British soil.

Land frontier 

The Treaty of Canterbury was signed by British Prime Minister Margaret Thatcher and Foreign Secretary Sir Geoffrey Howe, French  President
François Mitterrand and Minister of Foreign Affairs Roland Dumas on 12 February 1986, and is the original document providing for the undersea tunnel between the two countries.
 
The Treaty of Canterbury (1986) is significant and unusual because it is a modern and recent modification to the national borders of the UK and France.
 
The Anglo-French Treaty on the Channel Tunnel was signed by both governments in Canterbury Cathedral. The treaty prepared the concession for the construction and operation of the fixed link by privately owned companies. It outlines the methods to be used for arbitration in the event of a dispute. It sets up the Intergovernmental Commission (IGC) which is responsible for monitoring all matters associated with the construction and operation of the tunnel on behalf of the British and French governments, together with a Safety Authority to advise the IGC.

It draws a land frontier between the two countries in the middle of the Channel tunnel – the first of its kind.

In the 1991 Sangatte Protocol, France signed an agreement with the United Kingdom to introduce 'juxtaposed controls' (in French, des bureaux de contrôles nationaux juxtaposés, or 'BCNJ') at Eurostar and Eurotunnel stations on immigration and customs, where investigations happen before travel. France is part of the Schengen Agreement, which has largely abolished border checks between member nations, but the United Kingdom is not.

These juxtaposed controls mean that passports are checked before boarding first by officials belonging to departing country and then officials of the destination country. These are placed only at the main Eurostar stations: French officials operate at London St Pancras, Ebbsfleet International and Ashford International, while British officials operate at Calais-Fréthun, Lille-Europe, Marne-la-Vallée–Chessy and Paris-Gare du Nord.  There are security checks before boarding as well. For the shuttle road-vehicle trains, there are juxtaposed passport controls before boarding the trains.

Bibliography 
 Georges Labrecque, « Les îles de l'Atlantique comme circonstances pertinentes à la délimitation des frontières maritimes », Norois, vol. 45, no 180 « L'Atlantique et les géographes », October–December 1998, p. 653–665 (DOI 10.3406/noroi.1998.6905), §1 « La frontière France/Royaume-Uni », p. 654–658.

See also
 Calais border barrier
 France–United Kingdom relations

References

 
International borders
International border crossings

External links
 France-UK Border Research: A library of research and primary sources regarding the situation for displaced people at the France-UK border